The Owatonna Firemen's Hall, formerly the Owatonna City and Firemen's Hall, is a historic government building in Owatonna, Minnesota, United States. It was built from 1906 to 1907 to house the Owatonna Fire Department and city government offices.  The city offices were relocated to the former campus of the Minnesota State Public School for Dependent and Neglected Children in 1974.  The Firemen's Hall continues to serve as the headquarters for the Owatonna Fire Department.

The Firemen's Hall building was listed on the National Register of Historic Places in 1997 for having local significance in the themes of architecture and politics/government.  It was nominated for serving as the government center and a key public facility in Owatonna, and for exemplifying the municipal buildings often built in late-19th/early-20th-century Minnesota.  In 2015 the Firemen's Hall was also listed as a contributing property to the Owatonna Commercial Historic District.

History
On September 19, 1905, a special election was held to gauge support from Owatonna residents for a $15,000.00 bond for the construction of a new city hall and fire station. The bond was passed. On July 17, 1906, the construction firm Hammel and Anderson, with a bid of $19,643.00, was awarded the contract for construction of the fire hall. On August 17 the two lots were donated to the city by the firemen for construction of a combination city hall and fire hall on the condition that the city would spend not less than $15,000.00 for construction of a three-story building. The firemen contributed $1,000 towards capital costs and obtained a 25-year lease. The cornerstone was laid on September 8, 1906. An opening ceremony was held on October 5, 1907 and the equipment was transferred to the new site, the same year, on November 5. The team used horse-drawn equipment until 1915, when the first motorized vehicle, a 1915 Jeffery, was purchased.

The city vacated their portion of the building in 1974, moving to the new West Hills campus on the site of the former state orphanage. A truck bay was built where the old Roxy Theatre stood, which was demolished in the 1950s, along with other improvements to the building, done in the 1996 renovation. An elevator was installed and the third floor remodeled in 2008.

In February 2016 the City of Owatonna purchased two lots for $184,000 on the corner of 24th Street and Kenyon Road, in northeastern Owatonna, for the future development of a fire sub-station. The city intended to wait for further development before any building is done. The time before any building occurs is estimated at 10 years.

Fire department chiefs 
 1875 – 1879: M. R. Srong
 1879 – 1884: H. Randal
 1884 – 1885: S. S. Green
 1886 – 1887: E. M. Twiford
 1888 – 1892: C. E. Luce
 1892 – 1895: F. G. Schuman
 1895 – 1898: E. M. Twiford
 1899 – 1900: O. Wood
 1901 – 1919: E. M. Twiford
 1919 – 1927: F. G. Schuman
 1927 – 1933: Andrew Erdman
 1933 – 1942: A. C. Smith
 1942 – 1972: Ed Slazak
 1972 – 1987: Frank Anderson
 1987 – 1988: Paul Illg
 1988 – 2001: Jerry Rosenthal
 2001 – 2022: Mike Johnson
 2022-Present: Ed Hoffman

Other uses 
The Owatonna Firemen's Hall is also the headquarters for Steele County Skywarn, a non-profit weather spotting organization.  Locally, it is a part of Steele County Emergency Management. It uses the third floor for meetings and another room in the building as a nerve center, to communicate with spotters out in the field, monitor weather conditions in and around Owatonna, and make reports to the National Weather Service in Chanhassen, Minnesota.

See also
 List of fire stations
 National Register of Historic Places listings in Steele County, Minnesota

References

External links
 Owatonna Fire Department

1906 establishments in Minnesota
Buildings and structures in Steele County, Minnesota
City and town halls on the National Register of Historic Places in Minnesota
Fire stations completed in 1907
Fire stations in Minnesota
Fire stations on the National Register of Historic Places in Minnesota
Former seats of local government
Government buildings completed in 1907
Individually listed contributing properties to historic districts on the National Register in Minnesota
National Register of Historic Places in Steele County, Minnesota
Romanesque Revival architecture in Minnesota